Koushik Bhattacharjee is an Indian classical vocalist and teacher at Doverlane Music Academy, Manindra Sangeet Tirtha, Bhowanipore Sangeet Sammilani.

Early life 

Koushik was born 1975 in Howrah, India. He is son of Rama Bhattacharjee and renowned classical vocalist, the late Pt. Pataki Bhattacharjee. At age of Seven, he started learning Indian Classical Music under guidance of Late Pt. Pataki Bhattacharjee and later after getting selected as a scholar at ITC Sangeet Research Academy he continued his training under Pt. Arun Bhaduri and Late. Pt. K G Ginde. He eventually became the "Ganda Bandh Shagird" of late Pt. K.G. Ginde and also trained later under the guidance of Pt. Sunil Bose.

Career 

Koushik has participated in many major and prestigious concerts, including the Dover Lane Music Conference, the ITC Sangeet Sammelan, the West Bengal State Music Conference, Uttarpara Sangeet Chakra, etc. in India and Radio France, Association Ganapati (Bordeaux, France), Theatre of La Rochelle (La Rochelle, France), ITC Tour in USA & Canada, different Countries of Europe, etc.

Awards and discography 
 "Samanwaya" (Audio CD) was released at Calcutta Press Club, released by Sagarika Music.
 "Vocational Award 2008" from Rotary Club of Salt Lake City, Kolkata.
 "Surmani Award" from Sur Singar Samsad, Mumbai.
 "Meditative Midnight" (Indian Classical – Video DVD) Released by Questz World.
 "Refusion" (Eastern/Western Classical Fusion – Audio CD) Released by Questz World.
 "Laagi Lagan" (Indian Classical – Audio CD) Released by Questz World.

Manindra Sangeet Tirtha 

Manindra Sangeet Tirtha  is an Indian Classical Music School established by Late Pt. Pataki Bhattacharjee in 1970 in the name of Koushik Bhattacharjee's Grandfather Late Pt. Manindranath Bhattacharjee, a Dhrupad Singer. This school deals with nurturing Young generation through Indian Classical Music by innovative Ideas. Koushik Bhattacharjee created Symphony of Ragas and A Fusion Plethora of East-West Classicals  (which was later published as 'Refusion' by Questz World) which were created to increase the Interest of Young generation to embrace Indian Classical Music.

References

External links 

 http://www.rietberg.ch/de-ch/events/2014/10/indisches-konzert-1910.aspx
 http://media.belurmath.org/public-celebration-2015-rag-sangeet-and-bhajan-by-sri-kaushik-bhattacharya-442#sthash.Q8qW0TdJ.dpbs
 https://www.outlookindia.com/magazine/story/malhar-for-nerves/300195?state=online
 
 
 https://web.archive.org/web/20140906110945/http://www.itcsra.org/sra_sammelan/friday_may2014.html
 http://www.rietberg.ch/de-ch/events/2014/10/indisches-konzert-1910.aspx
 
 https://www.outlookindia.com/magazine/story/malhar-for-nerves/300195?state=online

1975 births
Hindustani singers
Indian male singers
Singers from Kolkata
Living people
[[Category:People from Howrah]]